Declinognathodus is an extinct genus of platform conodonts.

Use in stratigraphy 
The Bashkirian, the oldest age of the Pennsylvanian (also known as Upper Carboniferous), contains six biozones based on conodont index fossils, two of which are named after Declinognathodus species:
 the zone of Declinognathodus marginodosus,
 the zone of Declinognathodus noduliferus.
The GSSP point is at Arrow Canyon, Nevada, USA, with the first appearance of Declinognathodus noduliferus sensu lato.

The base of the Moscovian, the second stage in the Pennsylvanian, is close to the first appearances of the conodonts Declinognathodus donetzianus Nemirovskaya, 1990 and Diplognathodus ellesmerensis Bender, 1980. The Moscovian can biostratigraphically be divided into five conodont biozones, one of which is named after a Declinognathodus species : the zone of Declinognathodus donetzianus. The GSSP candidate sections are the Ural mountains or in Naqing (Nashui), Luodian County, Guizhou, China.

References 

 Early evolution of Declinognathodus close to the Mid-Carboniferous Boundary interval in the Barcaliente type section (Spain). Javier Sanz-López and Silvia Blanco-Ferrera, Palaeontology, September 2013, Volume 56, Issue 5, pages 927–946, 
 Conodont chronostratigraphical resolution and Declinognathodus evolution close to the Mid-Carboniferous Boundary in the Barcaliente Formation type section, NW Spain. Javier Sanz-López, Silvia Blanco-Ferrera and Luis C. Sánchez de Posada, Lethaia, October 2013, Volume 46, Issue 4, pages 438–453,

External links 
 
 

Conodont genera
Pennsylvanian conodonts